"Something Real" is a 1987 single by the band Mr. Mister and the first single from Go On.... The song hit No. 29 on the Billboard Hot 100 in 1987, making it their final top 40 hit in the United States.  An earlier version was featured on the soundtrack to the 1986 film, Youngblood  and the song was re-recorded for Go On....

Track listing
7" single
"Something Real (Inside Me/Inside You)" - 4:19
"Bare My Soul" - 4:31

12" single
"Something Real (Inside Me/Inside You)" (Rock Dance Mix) - 6:24
"Something Real (Inside Me/Inside You)" (Instrumental) - 6:04
"Bare My Soul" - 4:31

Charts

References

External links
Discography of Mr. Mister: Something real

1987 singles
Mr. Mister songs

Songs written by Steve George (keyboardist)
Songs written by Richard Page (musician)
1986 songs
RCA Records singles